Little Merrill Lake is a lake in the Moira River and Lake Ontario drainage basins in Addington Highlands, Lennox and Addington County in Ontario, Canada.

The primary inflow is Merrill Creek from Merrill Lake at the north, and there are three unnamed creek secondary inflows: one at the northeast, one at the east from Little Mink Lake, and one at the southeast. Merrill Creek is also the primary outflow, at the southwest, towards Whitefish Lake. Merrill Creek flows via Partridge Creek, the Skootamatta River and the Moira River into the Bay of Quinte on Lake Ontario at Belleville.

See also
List of lakes in Ontario

References

Lakes of Lennox and Addington County